Stephen Alexander Martin  (born 13 April 1959) is a former field hockey player from Northern Ireland who represented both Ireland and Great Britain at international level. Between 1980 and 1991 he made 135 senior appearances for Ireland. He also captained the Ireland team. He represented Ireland at the 1983, 1987 and 1991 EuroHockey Nations Championships and at the 1990 Men's Hockey World Cup. Between 1983 and 1992 Martin also made 94 senior appearances for Great Britain. He represented Great Britain at the 1984, 1988 and 1992 Summer Olympics, winning a bronze medal in 1984 and a gold medal in 1988. In 2001 he was awarded an Honorary Doctorate by Ulster University. In 2011 Martin was inducted into the Irish Hockey Association Hall of Fame. After retiring as a field hockey player, Martin became a sports administrator. Between 1998 and 2005 he served as Deputy Chief Executive of the British Olympic Association and between 2006 and 2018 he served as Chief Executive of the Olympic Council of Ireland. He now runs his own leadership and management consultancy business and is an associate consultant at Lane 4.He is currently Chair Commonwealth Games NI.

Early years, family and education
Martin is the son of Jim and Mamie Martin. His father was originally from Portadown while his mother was originally from Lisbellaw. They both moved to Donaghadee in the early 1950s and when Stephen was born on 13 April 1959, they were living in Bangor, County Down. The Martins ran a local garage and a car repair shop in Bangor. Martin was educated at Bangor Central Primary School, Bloomfield Road Primary School, Bangor Grammar School and Ulster University. He graduated from Ulster University in 1985 with a BA Honours Degree in Sport and Leisure Studies. In his youth he played both association football and rugby union before his older brother, Phillip, introduced him to field hockey. He was also a notable golfer. He was a member of the Bangor Grammar School team that won the Ulster and Irish schools golf championship in 1976 and 1977. Other members of the team included his older brother Philip Martin, David Feherty and Mark Robson, the Sky Sports rugby union commentator.

Domestic teams
As a schoolboy Martin played field hockey for Bangor Grammar School and Ulster Schools.  At senior club level he has played for several clubs including Bangor, Belfast YMCA, Holywood 87, Newry Olympic and Annadale. Martin also  represented Ulster University at intervarsity level, helping Ulster Elks win the 1985 Mauritius Cup. He also represented Ulster at interprovincial level. In 2008 and 2009 he played alongside his son, Patrick, in the second team at Lisnagarvey.

International

Ireland
Martin was a member of the Ireland team that were silver medallists at the 1978 EuroHockey Junior Championship. Other members of the team included Martin Sloan, Jimmy Kirkwood and Billy McConnell. He made his senior Ireland debut aged 19. Between 1980 and 1991 he made 135 senior appearances for Ireland. He also captained the Ireland team. He represented Ireland at the 1983, 1987 and 1991 EuroHockey Nations Championships and at the 1990 Men's Hockey World Cup. In 2011 Martin was inducted into the Irish Hockey Association Hall of Fame.

Great Britain
Between 1983 and 1992 Martin made 94 senior appearances for Great Britain. He made his debut for Great Britain against the United States. He subsequently represented Great Britain at the 1984, 1988 and 1992 Summer Olympics, winning a bronze medal in 1984 and a gold medal in 1988. Martin also represented Great Britain in Champions Trophy tournaments, winning a bronze medal in 1984 and a silver in 1985.

Sports administrator
While still an active field hockey player, Martin worked for the Ulster Hockey Union as a Sports Development Manager. Between 1992 and 1998 he worked for Sport Northern Ireland as a Performance Manager. Between 1998 and 2005 he served as Deputy Chief Executive of the British Olympic Association. He also served as Chef de Mission for Great Britain at the 2000 and 2004 Summer Olympics and at the 2002 Winter Olympics. Between 2006 and 2018 he served as Chief Executive of the Olympic Council of Ireland. He served as Deputy Chef de Mission for Ireland at the 2012 Team Irelands most successful and best prepared team in Olympic history , and 2016 Summer Olympics. He was also Chef de Mission for Ireland at the 2014 and 2018 Winter Olympics.He was Sports Mansger for Team NI at the Birmingham 2022 Commonwealth Games - Team NI’s most successful in their history. In November 2022 he was elected as Chair Commonwealth Games NI.

Personal life
Martin is married to Dorothy Armstrong. They have two children, Patrick and Hannah. The Martin family home is in Holywood, County Down. Martin's wife and children have all played  field hockey at a senior level. Dorothy played in the Ulster Senior League for Knock and Grosvenor. She later worked as a PE teacher at Priory Integrated College. Patrick Martin has played for Lisnagarvey in the Men's Irish Hockey League while Hannah Martin, a graduate of Ulster University, has played for Ards in the Women's Irish Hockey League. Her coaches have included her father.

Honours
Great Britain
Olympic Games
Winners: 1988
Champions Trophy
Runners up: 1985
Ireland
EuroHockey Junior Championship
Runners up: 1978
Ulster Elks
Mauritius Cup
Winners: 1985: 1

References

External links
 

1959 births
Living people
Male field hockey players from Northern Ireland
Irish male field hockey players
Ireland international men's field hockey players
Olympic field hockey players of Great Britain
British male field hockey players
Olympic gold medallists for Great Britain
Olympic bronze medallists for Great Britain
Field hockey players at the 1984 Summer Olympics
Field hockey players at the 1988 Summer Olympics
Field hockey players at the 1992 Summer Olympics
Olympic medalists in field hockey
Medalists at the 1988 Summer Olympics
Medalists at the 1984 Summer Olympics
1990 Men's Hockey World Cup players
Male field hockey defenders
Lisnagarvey Hockey Club players
Irish field hockey coaches
Irish male golfers
Male golfers from Northern Ireland
Sportspeople from County Down
People educated at Bangor Grammar School
Alumni of Ulster University
Olympic Federation of Ireland officials
Irish field hockey administrators
Members of the Order of the British Empire
People from Holywood, County Down
People from Bangor, County Down